Auroraville (also Aurorahville) is an unincorporated community located in the town of Aurora, Waushara County, Wisconsin, United States.

Notes

Unincorporated communities in Waushara County, Wisconsin
Unincorporated communities in Wisconsin